Caloundra Australian Football Club is an Australian rules football club that is based in Caloundra, Sunshine Coast, Queensland.  It competes in the QFA Division 1.

Known as the Panthers, Caloundra used to play in a higher division but, due to player shortages for the 2012 season, it can only gather a side for a lower division that does not field a reserve team.

History
The club started in 1973 and played in the Sunshine Coast and Gympie Districts AFL. After winning back to back premierships in 1987 and 1988 the club transferred to the QAFL for the 1990 season.

The switch was not a success as Morningside kicked a record score against them – Morningside 47.28.310 defeated Caloundra 1.3.9.

After returning to the Sunshine Coast in 1991 it won the premiership, and followed up again in 1992.

In 1993, the league shut down and the Sunshine Coast clubs played in the Brisbane AFL. Caloundra lost the 1993 Grand final to Maroochydore by eleven points. In 2000, a major reorganization of football in southern Queensland saw Caloundra placed in division one.

After being runner-up in 2007 and 2008 the club won the 2010 premiership by defeating the Coorparoo Kings 9.16.70 to 7.12.54.

Premierships
1987 – Sunshine Coast AFL
1988 – Sunshine Coast AFL
1991 – Sunshine Coast AFL
1992 – Sunshine Coast AFL
2010 – AFL Queensland State Division 1
2012 – SEQAFL – Division 4 Northern

AFL Players from Caloundra
Jason Millar – Brisbane Bears (1991)
Ben J. Thompson – Carlton (1998–1999)
Nathan Clarke – Brisbane Lions (2000–2002)
Austin Lucy – Essendon (2006)
Chris Smith – Fremantle (2007–2008)
Daniel Dzufer – Brisbane Lions (2007–2009)
Sam J. Reid – Western Bulldogs (2008–2011), Greater Western Sydney Giants (2012–2013, 2016–present)
Eric Hipwood – Brisbane Lions (2016–present)

References

External links
Aussierulesinternational.com
Official Site

Queensland State Football League clubs
1973 establishments in Australia
Australian rules football clubs established in 1973
Caloundra